Nathan Lee "Nate" Bussey (born February 20, 1989) is a former American football linebacker. He was drafted by the New Orleans Saints in the seventh round of the 2011 NFL Draft. He played college football at Illinois. He was also a member of the Jacksonville Jaguars, Omaha Nighthawks and Hamilton Tiger-Cats.

Professional career

New Orleans Saints
Bussey was drafted by the New Orleans Saints in the seventh round of the 2011 NFL Draft. He signed a 4-year contract with the team on July 28, 2011. He was waived on September 3, 2011, and re-signed to the team's practice squad on September 4. He remained with the Saints through the 2012 season. He played in the Saints' playoff win over the Detroit Lions on January 7, 2012.

Jacksonville Jaguars
Bussey was claimed off waivers by the Jacksonville Jaguars on August 13, 2012. He was released on August 25.

Omaha Nighthawks
Was a member of the Omaha Nighthawks of the United Football League for the 2012 UFL season.

Hamilton Tiger-Cats
Signed with the Hamilton Tiger-Cats of the Canadian Football League on April 11, 2013.

References

External links
 
 
 
 Omaha Nighthawks profile
 New Orleans Saints profile
 Illinois Fighting Illini profile
 Nate Bussey at Just Sports Stats
 

1989 births
Living people
Players of American football from Washington, D.C.
American football linebackers
Canadian football linebackers
African-American players of American football
African-American players of Canadian football
Illinois Fighting Illini football players
New Orleans Saints players
Jacksonville Jaguars players
Omaha Nighthawks players
Hamilton Tiger-Cats players
Dunbar High School (Washington, D.C.) alumni
21st-century African-American sportspeople
20th-century African-American people